Web Therapy is an American comedy series that premiered on Showtime on July 19, 2011. It is based on the web series of the same name and stars Lisa Kudrow as Fiona Wallice, a therapist who works with patients over the Internet.

Web Therapy initially received mixed reviews from critics but has since received more positive reviews, with many critics praising Kudrow's performance.

On August 11, 2015, Showtime cancelled the series after four seasons.

Plot
The series follows Fiona Wallice, a therapist who has conceived of a new form, or as Fiona pretentiously calls it a new "modality," of therapy: the titular "web therapy". In her estimation, the traditional "50 minute hour" version of therapy gives people too much leeway to talk about irrelevant things. By dramatically shortening session time, she hopes to get results more quickly. The sessions are taped in the hope of attracting investors into promoting her new technique as a worldwide therapy option.

Cast
 Lisa Kudrow as Fiona Wallice, a self-professed web therapist who offers quick therapy sessions over the internet. At the beginning of the first season, she is focused on building her own franchise, especially after having been involved in a mysterious scandal towards the end of her previous career in finance. The series gradually reveals that Fiona has just as many issues as her patients: she was obese as a child; she was ignored by her parents in favor of her sister; she was nearly thrown out of college for plagiarism and sleeping with her professor; and her husband, Kip, is secretly gay. She refuses to acknowledge any of these problems, however, and is not smart enough to realize that most of the people in her life dislike her, and is too narcissistic to care. She eventually develops a softer side, however, as she learns to care (in her way) for the people around her.

Recurring cast
 Dan Bucatinsky as Jerome Sokoloff, an employee services worker at Visa who is Fiona's only holdover from her 50-minute sessions. After a disastrous attempt to use Jerome and Hayley's apparent incest to capitalize on Web Therapy, she uses him to check on her husband's extracurricular activities. This results in Jerome losing his job because of his alarming assertiveness, but to make up for that, she gives him a job as her personal assistant. Along with helping Fiona write her book, Jerome dabbles in side projects without Fiona's consent (submitting unused chapters to Fiona's publisher, arranging Hayley to tag along on Fiona's trip to visit Allegra, helping Hayley with two movie projects which contain elements of her life and allowing Hayley to stay in Fiona's New York home to entertain clients).
 Victor Garber as Kip Wallice, Fiona's long-suffering, closeted husband of 19 years (since 1994) who is also her attorney. Fiona discovers his sexual proclivities when Robin tells her Kip tried to seduce her because he thought she was a transvestite; she also learns about his secret life after finding receipts for gay pornography and sex toys. When she confronts him on his behavior, he denies that he is gay, claiming there is a conspiracy against him and that he bought the items for a co-worker's bachelor party. He then says that he wants her to be his wife while he runs for Congress. Fiona is forced to play the role of supportive wife for a while, even at the expense of her romance with Austen, but her discovery of Kip's relationship with Ben reconfirms her earlier suspicions, and it does not take her long to let Robin reveal the relationship through taped footage. While Kip and Ben go to New Mexico afterwards, Kip and Fiona begin divorce proceedings in order to move on with their lives.
 Lily Tomlin as Putsy Hodge, Fiona's wealthy, unloving mother. Putsy thinks Web Therapy is a ridiculous waste of time and an embarrassment, and she lets Fiona know it in no uncertain terms. Initially introduced as a woman who seems to favor Kip over her two daughters, Putsy develops a mentally unstable personality as she takes in a son she put up for adoption long before marrying Fiona's father, resulting in Fiona stopping him from stealing from her, starts to exhibit even less motherly behaviour towards her grandchildren, and even starts a Net Therapy business running in competition with Fiona's Web Therapy.
 Jennifer Elise Cox as Gina Spinks, the ditsy receptionist at Fiona's former workplace and her best friend. Gina looks up to Fiona as a role model and follows her advice, and Fiona sees Gina as the only female connection to her former workplace. Gina is there to provide favors for Fiona relating to her investors at Web Therapy, and can dish out important information about her co-workers, including Richard, and in return, Fiona gives relationship advice to Gina, helps her find a job in Alaska during hard times, and helps her and Austen draw up terms for a pre-nup mostly in Gina's favor. Their close friendship is strong that they engage in web-chat mocktails together and engage in "girl-talk" even when other people are in the room.
 Tim Bagley as Richard Pratt, Fiona's former co-worker whose relationship issues Fiona solves. Afterward she inadvertently disorients the relationship causing Richard to develop feelings for her. He stalks her until Fiona threatens to terminate contact between them unless he tones his behaviour down. Fiona later gets him a job with Kip's campaign, during which he starts dating Robin. However, Robin thinks that this is only because he is still in love with Fiona. Fiona discovers Robin is being hurtful toward Richard, and she fires Robin. Richard takes this as a romantic gesture. He nevertheless marries Robin soon afterwards, although he still feels her condescending behaviour is affecting him.
 Julie Claire as Robin Griner, a gossip girl documentarian who tries to begin a relationship with Kip, discovers his gay tendencies first and becomes the primary antagonist of the series. She wants to reunite with Fiona, but after discovering her side of the story, threatens to release her recording of the conversation unless she gets a job in the campaign. The job does not last long as Fiona discovers Robin is dating Richard as a rebound, has tapes exposing Kip and Ben's relationship, and is condescending to Richard; he fires her. After releasing the tapes and putting the campaign in jeopardy, Robin marries Richard, has an affair leaving the paternity of her child uncertain, and is contacted by Fiona to hand over the tapes to prove her innocence, while Fiona also expresses interest in her work and to reunite.
 Alan Cumming as Austen Clarke, a worldwide media mogul who happens to do good deeds to people in poor countries, and Fiona's main love interest. Fiona seems to have much more in common with Austen than with her own husband, and it is by luck that she secures both a book publishing deal and a potential romance with him. Their romance has been put on long-term hold twice, the first time being Kip's campaign, for which Austen becomes a backer, and the second when Fiona discovers Austen may have impregnated Gina during their time apart. While Fiona tries to distance herself from Austen, he manages to gain Fiona's forgiveness by buying her a dream penthouse apartment in New York and shelving Putsy's Web Therapy.
 Rashida Jones as Hayley Feldman-Tate, Jerome's fiancée and later his wife. After some sibling-rivalry sessions that she became uncomfortable with, Hayley has developed a strange personality, as she expects Jerome to handle and pay for her expensive demands for the wedding, is arrested for mysterious scissors in her luggage before her trip, entertains clients at Fiona's New York house, and is mentioned by her surrogate that she hates Fiona. However, on top of that, she helps Jerome help rework Fiona's book, becomes a head writer for the movie adaptation and becomes Fiona's personal assistant while Jerome takes leave, but Fiona thinks that Hayley is less reliable than Jerome.
 Michael McDonald as Ben Tomlund, Kip's campaign manager. He clashes with Fiona on several issues, is the first to actively warn her to suspend her treatment modality to get her accreditation, and is discovered by Fiona to be having an affair with Kip. After the campaign, Fiona becomes suspicious that Ben is trying to set her up during an investigation.

Guest stars
Kudrow's former Friends costars David Schwimmer, Matthew Perry, Matt LeBlanc and Courteney Cox have all appeared as guest stars on Web Therapy. Other guest stars that have appeared over the course of the series include: Maulik Pancholy, Steven Weber, Bob Balaban, Jane Lynch, Rosie O'Donnell, Selma Blair, Conan O'Brien, Molly Shannon, Steve Carell, Minnie Driver, Meryl Streep, Julia Louis-Dreyfus, Meg Ryan, Sara Gilbert, Chelsea Handler, Megan Mullally, Mae Whitman, Darren Criss, Billy Crystal, Calista Flockhart, Jon Hamm, Caspar Lee, Gwyneth Paltrow, Dax Shepard, Craig Ferguson, Jesse Tyler Ferguson, Lauren Graham, Nina García, Allison Janney and Christina Applegate.

Jennifer Aniston was approached by Kudrow to appear as a guest star before the series got cancelled.

Episodes

Production
In April 2010, Showtime announced plans to run the online episodes on television with extra scenes being shot to fit the half-hour format. The TV version was given 10 half-hour episodes for its first season. The series is executive produced by Lisa Kudrow, Diane Charles, Ron Qurashi and Dan Bucatinsky,  produced by Jodi Binstock, co-executive produced by Jodi Binstock and David Codron, and the production company Is or Isn't Entertainment. The series has all the guest stars from the online series appearing.

In December 2011, Showtime renewed Web Therapy for a second season of 11 episodes, which premiered on July 2, 2012. On November 16, 2012, Web Therapy was renewed for a 10 episode third season by Showtime. On January 14, 2014, Showtime renewed Web Therapy for a 12 episode fourth season.

Casting
The TV series features more of Fiona's personal life instead of just her patient sessions, and introduces Victor Garber as Kip Wallice, Fiona's long-suffering husband who is also her attorney, and Lily Tomlin as Putsy Hodge, Fiona's proper upper-crust mother who is having money troubles. Putsy thinks web therapy is a ridiculous waste of time and an embarrassment, and she lets Fiona know it in no uncertain terms. New cast members introduced for the TV series include: Jennifer Elise Cox as Gina Spinks, the ditsy receptionist at Fiona's former workplace, and Maulik Pancholy as Kamal Prakash, an IT worker from Kip's office whom Fiona recruits to help set up her internet system.

Reception
The first season of Web Therapy received mixed reviews, scoring a 55 out of 100 on Metacritic, based on 10 critics, indicating "mixed or average reviews". On Rotten Tomatoes the first season of the show has a rating of 45%, based on 11 reviews, with an average rating of 5/10. The site's consensus reads, "Web Therapy quickly wears out its welcome by not providing consistent laughs or an energizing plot." Sal Cinquemani from Slant Magazine said "the often painful Web Therapy is almost completely reliant on its dialogue and acting".  Mary McNamara from Los Angeles Times, gave the season a positive review, saying that the show is "innovative and hilarious". The performances of the guest stars, such as Lily Tomlin and Meryl Streep, have received praise.

The second season received critical acclaim, scoring 83 out of 100 on Metacritic, with many critics praising the chemistry between Kudrow and the show's guest stars. Jessica Shaw of Entertainment Weekly praised the show's writing: "Lisa Kudrow is hilarious as online shrink Fiona Wallice, but her true talent is making those around her even funnier". Curt Wagner of Red Eye praised the improvisational skills of the cast, writing: "It's mostly improvised, which makes the funny exchanges between Kudrow and her guest stars even more impressive." Mark A. Perigard of The Boston Herald gave the show a positive review during a joint review of Web Therapy and Kudrow's former Friends co-star, Matt LeBlanc's show Episodes, calling it "far more entertaining [than Episodes], but, alas, wildly uneven, probably in part due to the need to weave new material around the Internet series of the same name that spawned it.

The third season also saw extremely positive reviews from critics, with praise especially reserved for Megan Mullally's performance. Clark Collins of Entertainment Weekly praised the show, with praise reserved for Mullally's performance. Matthew Wolfson gave the season a positive review, giving it three stars out of five.

Home media
Web Therapy: The Complete First Season was released on DVD in Region 1 on June 19, 2012, and in Region 4 on August 7, 2013. The two-disc set contains all 10 episodes from season one.

Web Therapy: The Complete Second Season was released on Region 1 DVD on June 18, 2013. The two-disc set contains all 11 episodes from season two, plus an unaired episode named "Royally F****d", in which Fiona gets her first international client (Natasha Bedingfield) calling from Buckingham Palace. Special features include a behind-the-scenes featurette, director cuts with Conan O'Brien and Meryl Streep, auto-tune music video, deleted scenes, and gag reels.

International versions
On 2 February 2016, FremantleMedia premiered a remake of the series on Spanish television, also titled Web Therapy. It aired on #0, the flagship TV channel of subscription platform Movistar+. It stars Eva Hache as Rebeca Miller, the equivalent of Fiona Wallice in the original series.

On 29 August 2017, it was announced that Stephen Mangan would star in and co-write a British adaptation titled Hang Ups for Channel 4 in the United Kingdom. It premiered on 8 August 2018.

On 7 May 2018, the Israeli version "הפסיכולוגית" ("The Psychologist") was uploaded on YouTube, and premiered on TV on 18 July 2018, on channel כאן 11.

On 21 October 2015, the Poland version "Web Therapy Web Therapy Shorts Web Therapy PL Web Therapy Polska Web Therapy Player.pl" ("Web Therapy Poland") was uploaded on player.pl, and premiered.

Beginning in 2017, the québécoise adaptation (titled "Web Thérapie") began airing on the tv station TV5 Québec Canada. Like the original version, this adaptation has many notable québécois(es) and French Canadian stars in supporting and guest roles. Édith Cochrane plays the lead role of "therapist" Florence Champagne. As of 2021, new episodes are still airing (in its 4th season).

References

External links
 
 

2011 American television series debuts
2015 American television series endings
Narcissism in television
2010s American comedy television series
Television series based on Internet-based works
Showtime (TV network) original programming
English-language television shows
Television shows set in Los Angeles
Television series by CBS Studios
Television series by Fremantle (company)
Improvisational television series
Television series created by Lisa Kudrow
Non-American television series based on American television series
Television shows remade overseas
Screenlife films